Eclectochromis is a small genus of haplochromine cichlids endemic  to Lake Malawi.

Species
There are currently two recognized species in this genus:
 Eclectochromis lobochilus (Trewavas, 1935)
 Eclectochromis ornatus (Regan, 1922)

References

 
Haplochromini

Cichlid genera
Taxa named by Ethelwynn Trewavas